How Memory Works is the second full-length album by the American band Joan of Arc. It was released in 1998 on Jade Tree Records. The artwork of the album suggests that it is something of a companion to the debut album, A Portable Model Of...: the booklets for both records contain the phrase "a portable model of... how memory works."

Production
Sessions for How Memory Works were held between October 1997 and February 1998. Nearly half of the album was recorded and mixed by Casey Rice at Electrical Audio, with assistance from Rob Bochnik and Greg Norman. The remaining songs were recorded and mixed by Elliot Dicks, Jeremy Boyle and Tim Kinsella at Elliot's Loft and Truckstop. Rice sequencing the album, while Alan Douches mastered it at West West Side Music in New Jersey.

Critical reception
The Village Voice wrote: "Tempos and volumes rise and fall unexpectedly, as [Tim] Kinsella's squirrelly guitar and voice register a whole gawky wonderama of awkward silences with surprising nerd authority for someone still shy of 25."

Track listing
All songs written by Joan of Arc.

 "Honestly Now" – 0:48
 "Gin & Platonic" – 3:32
 "To've Had Two Of" – 3:07
 "This Life Cumulative" – 3:41
 "A Pale Orange" – 6:47
 "White Out" – 3:50
 "So Open; Hooray!" – 4:23
 "A Name" – 3:08
 "Osmosis Doesn't Work" – 3:33
 "God Bless America" – 2:22
 "A Party Able Model Of" – 2:52

Personnel
Personnel per booklet.

Joan of Arc
 Eric Bocek – guitar
 Jeremy Boyle – guitar
 Tim Kinsella – vocals, guitar
 Mike Kinsella – drums
 Sam Zurick – bass guitar

Additional musicians
 Marty Ackley – musical saw (track 9)
 Zach Fiocca – vibraphone (track 3)
 Julie Pomerleau – violin (tracks 3 and 11), viola (tracks 3 and 11)
 Griffin Rodriquez – cello (track 3)

Production and design
 Casey Rice – recording (tracks 2–4, 6, 8 and 10), mixing (tracks 2–4, 6, 8 and 10), sequencing
 Rob Bochnik – assistance
 Greg Norman – assistance
 Elliot Dicks – recording (tracks 1, 3, 5, 7, 9 and 11), mixing (tracks 1, 3, 5, 7, 9 and 11)
 Jeremy Boyle – recording (tracks 1, 3, 5, 7, 9 and 11), mixing (tracks 1, 3, 5, 7, 9 and 11), cover painting
 Tim Kinsella – recording (tracks 1, 3, 5, 7, 9 and 11), mixing (tracks 1, 3, 5, 7, 9 and 11)
 Alan Douches – mastering
 Jason Gnewikow – photography, art direction, design

References

Joan of Arc (band) albums
1998 albums
Jade Tree (record label) albums